Schiøler Linck born Valdemar Schiøler Linck (26 October 1878 – 6 September 1952), was a Danish stage and film actor.

He debuted in the Faaborg Teater in 1897 and in 1932 starred in the film Odds 777 followed by De blaa drenge in 1933.

Filmography
Der var engang (1922) 
Buridan, le héros de la Tour de Nesle (1924)
Den sørgmuntre barber (1927) 
Sikke tider (1929) 
Sikke en nat (1929) 
Begravelsesherrerne (1931) 
Odds 777 (1932)
De blaa drenge (1933)
Så til søs (1933)
Nyhavn 17 (1933)
Den ny husassistent (1933)
Nøddebo Præstegård (1934)
Sjette trækning (1936)
Bolettes brudefærd (1938)
Ballade i Nyhavn (1942)
Det kære København (1944)
Far betaler (1946)

1878 births
1952 deaths
Danish male film actors
Danish male silent film actors
20th-century Danish male actors
Danish male stage actors
Male actors from Copenhagen
19th-century Danish people